"Who'll Be the Fool Tonight" is a song by Neil Larsen and Buzz Feiten. It was released as a single in 1980 from their self-titled album.

The song peaked at No. 29 on the Billboard Hot 100, becoming the duo's only top 40 hit.

Chart performance

See also
List of one-hit wonders in the United States

References

1980 singles
1980 songs
Warner Records singles